Alor Tajar, also known as Tajar, is a subdistrict, located in Kota Setar District, Kedah, Malaysia.

This district is located adjacent to Derga parish, Pendang and Pokok Sena districts. There are Kampong 29 parishes in this area. The total area is 44,988 km2. Most of the land is used for agriculture, such as paddy cultivation. The population is of 6.966 people and a number of dwellings estimated to reach 1.652.

Infrastructure Facilities
 Sekolah Menengah Kebangsaan Tajar
 Sekolah Kebangsaan Darul Hikmah (formerly SK Tok Sibil).
 Sekolah Kebangsaan Gelam
 Kuarters SMK Tajar.

Road Networks
 Jalan Datuk Kumbar
 Jalan Alor Mengkudu
 Jalan Titi Haji Idris
 Jalan Kampung Jelai
 Jalan Kampung Tok Keling

Village List
 Kampung Alor Binjal
 Kampung Pulau Binjal
 Kampung Bok-Bok
 Kampung Gelam
 Kampung Jelai
 Kampung Padang
 Kampung Tok Sibil
 Kampung Tok Keling

Other Facilities
There are not much facilities in the villagers here.

 

Mukims of Kedah